The Lowry Hotel is located by the River Irwell in Salford, Greater Manchester, England. The five-star hotel is named after the artist L. S. Lowry. Although within the boundaries of the City of Salford, it is close to Manchester city centre and is known as "The Lowry Hotel Manchester". Upon opening, Marco Pierre White was the overseeing chef of the River Room restaurant.

The hotel was owned by The Rocco Forte Collection, the company of Sir Rocco Forte, son of the late hotel magnate Baron Charles Forte. In November 2016, the hotel was put up for sale, two years after being acquired by Westmont Hospitality Group and Mount Kellett Capital Management in a deal estimated to be worth £40m.

Architecture 
The Lowry Hotel structure is a reinforced concrete frame on continuous flight auger piles constructed on a brown field site adjacent to the River Irwell. The external façades are glazed with rain screen cladding hung from the frame. Public and service areas are situated on the two lower floors, with the conference centre accessible through a second entrance. Riverside Suites and the Presidential Suite are situated on the floors above.

Bedrooms 
The bedroom areas from the third to eighth floors include Riverside Suites, and a Presidential Suite, . The Presidential Suite is also called the Charles Forte Suite, a nod to its past as a property of the Forte Group.

Guests 
Portuguese football manager Jose Mourinho lived in the Lowry during his time as manager of Manchester United, spending an estimated £716,000 over more than two years.

References

External links
Hotel Website
thelowryhotel.com

Hotels established in 2001
Hotels in Greater Manchester
Buildings and structures in Salford